Abdourahmane Sow, (born March 14, 1942 in Cambérène) Minister of the Interior of Senegal under the presidency of Abdou Diouf, held the post of chair of the World Scout Committee.

In 1995 he became Minister of the Interior in the third government of Habib Thiam, replacing Djibo Leyti Kâ. General Lamine Cissé succeeded him in January 1998.

In 1998 Sow was appointed Minister of Urban Planning and Habitat in the government of Mamadou Lamine Loum.
After being a socialist minister for several years, he was elected Liberal deputy of Louga to the National Assembly, of which he became the fourth vice-president.

Sow is married and has 6 children.

References

External links
 Babacar Ndiaye et Waly Ndiaye, Présidents et ministres de la République du Sénégal, Dakar, 2006 (2e éd.), p. 393
 Fiche d'Abdourahmane Sow sur le site de l'Assemblée nationale

Scouting and Guiding in Senegal
World Scout Committee members
1942 births
Living people